The Vitalogy Tour was a concert tour by the American rock band Pearl Jam to support its third album, Vitalogy.

History
Pearl Jam promoted Vitalogy with tours in Asia, Oceania, and the United States in 1995. The band was joined by new drummer Jack Irons. The short tour of the United States focused on the Midwest and the West Coast. The band continued its boycott against Ticketmaster during its tour of the United States, refusing to play in Ticketmaster's venue areas, but was surprised that virtually no other bands joined it in refusing to play at Ticketmaster venues. The band chose to use alternate ticketing companies for the shows.

The tour of the United States faced various troubles. Bassist Jeff Ament said that the band and its crew had to "[build] shows from the ground up, a venue everywhere we went." In June 1995, the band was scheduled to play at San Francisco's Golden Gate Park in front of 50,000 people. Before the concert vocalist Eddie Vedder was forced to stay at a hospital after suffering from the effects of food poisoning. Vedder left the hospital to play the show; however, he was not able to finish and ended up performing just seven out of twenty-one songs with the band. Neil Young filled in for Vedder for the rest of the show that day. Vedder said, "That whole [Golden Gate Park] thing was a blur based on some bad food. It was really, really bad. Looking back at it, it doesn't seem as intense as it was, but it was horrible. I just felt not human and looking back I should have got through that show somehow, and I think the fact that Neil [Young] was there made me feel like I could get off the hook in some way and I did go out for a few songs." Because of Vedder's health the band was forced to cancel the remaining dates of its tour of the United States. The Milwaukee dates at the Marcus Amphitheater and the Chicago date at Soldier Field were eventually reinstated and the rest of the dates were rescheduled for the fall.

About cancelling the dates, Vedder said, "I think we all agreed that it had gotten insane, that it was no longer about the music." Ament later said, "We were so hardheaded about the 1995 tour. Had to prove we could tour on our own, and it pretty much killed us, killed our career." A concert video of the Australian tour was planned, but later scrapped.

A professionally shot and edited video bootleg of the Pacific Leg tour has been circulating among fans for years, but was never officially released. Several scenes from this video can be seen in Pearl Jam Twenty, which was released in 2011.

Tour dates
Information taken from various sources.

Cancellations and rescheduled shows

Band members
Jeff Ament – bass guitar
Stone Gossard – rhythm guitar
Mike McCready – lead guitar
Eddie Vedder – lead vocals, guitar
Jack Irons – drums

Songs performed

Originals
"Alive"
"Animal"
"Better Man"
"Black"
"Blood"
"Brain of J."
"Corduroy"
"Daughter"
"Dead Man"
"Deep"
"Dissident"
"Elderly Woman Behind the Counter in a Small Town"
"Even Flow"
"Falling Down"
"Footsteps"
"Garden"
"Glorified G"
"Go"
"I Got Id"
"Habit"
"Hey Foxymophandlemama, That's Me" (snippet)
"Immortality"
"Indifference"
"Jeremy"
"Last Exit"
"Leash"
"Long Road"
"Lukin"
"Not for You"
"Oceans"
"Once"
"Porch"
"Rats"
"Rearviewmirror"
"Red Mosquito"
"Release"
"Satan's Bed"
"Spin the Black Circle"
"State of Love and Trust"
"Tremor Christ"
"W.M.A."
"Whipping"
"Why Go"
"Yellow Ledbetter"

Covers
"Act of Love" (Neil Young)
"Against the 70's" (Mike Watt)
"Another Brick in the Wall" (Pink Floyd) (snippet)
"Baba O'Riley" (The Who)
"Catholic Boy" (Jim Carroll) (snippet)
"Everyday People" (Sly & the Family Stone)
"Forever in Blue Jeans" (Neil Diamond)
"Happy Birthday" (traditional)
"Hey Hey, My My (Into the Black)" (Neil Young) (snippet)
"History Never Repeats" (Split Enz)
"I Believe in Miracles" (Ramones) (snippet)
"I Can't Explain" (The Who)
"I Got You" (Split Enz)
"I Only Play 4 Money" (The Frogs)
"I Want You to Want Me" (Cheap Trick) (snippet)
"(I'm Not Your) Steppin' Stone" (The Monkees) (snippet)
"I'm One" (The Who) (snippet)
"I've Just Seen a Face" (The Beatles)
"Is There Anybody Out There?" (Pink Floyd) (snippet)
"The Kids Are Alright" (The Who)
"Leaving Here" (Edward Holland, Jr.)
"Let My Love Open the Door" (Pete Townshend)
"Little Wing" (Jimi Hendrix)
"Maggot Brain" (Funkadelic)
"The Needle and the Damage Done" (Neil Young)
"Pulled Up" (Talking Heads) (snippet)
"The Real Me" (The Who) (snippet)
"Redemption Song" (Bob Marley & The Wailers)
"Rockin' in the Free World" (Neil Young)
"The Ship Song" (Nick Cave)
"Sick o' Pussies" (Bad Radio) (snippet)
"So You Want to Be a Rock 'n' Roll Star" (The Byrds)
"Sonic Reducer" (The Dead Boys)
"Starboy" (The Frogs)
"Stuff and Nonsense" (Split Enz) (snippet)
"Suggestion" (Fugazi) (snippet)
"Talk About the Passion" (R.E.M.)
"this boy." (that dog.)
"Throw Your Arms Around Me" (Hunters & Collectors)
"Touch of Grey" (Grateful Dead) (snippet)
"Voodoo Chile" (The Jimi Hendrix Experience) (snippet)
"Young Man Blues" (Mose Allison) (snippet)

References

1995 concert tours
Pearl Jam concert tours